WTJC-LP (96.9 FM) is a radio station licensed to serve Charlotte Amalie, U.S. Virgin Islands. The station is owned by Methodist Church St. Thomas St. John Circuit Inc. It airs a Religious/Caribbean Gospel music format featuring a mix of teaching programs and Christian music. While many low-power FM stations cover only a limited area, due to the size of the U.S. Virgin Islands this station covers most of the population with a city-grade signal.

This station has been assigned the WTJC-LP call sign by the Federal Communications Commission since April 28, 2003.

WTJC-LP's broadcast center is located in the Christchurch Methodist Education and Outreach Complex in Market Square on St. Thomas. In 2004, in celebration of its first anniversary of broadcasting, this Methodist Radio Ministry station held a Praise-a-thon.

References

External links
 WTJC-LP official website
 

TJC-LP
Low-power FM radio stations in the United States
Radio stations established in 2003
2003 establishments in the United States Virgin Islands
Charlotte Amalie, U.S. Virgin Islands
Gospel radio stations in the United States